Alois Mayer (14 June 1949 – 4 February 2023) was an Austrian politician. A member of the Social Democratic Party, he served in the Municipal Council and Landtag of Vienna from 1997 to 2015.

Mayer died on 4 February 2023, at the age of 73.

References

1949 births
2023 deaths
Social Democratic Party of Austria politicians
Members of the Municipal Council and Landtag of Vienna